Serhiy Horodnichov (born 31 January 1970) is a retired male boxer from Ukraine. He represented his native country at the 1996 Summer Olympics in Atlanta, Georgia, where he was stopped in the first round of the men's light-middleweight division (– 71 kg) by Cuba's eventual silver medalist Alfredo Duvergel.

References
sports-reference

1970 births
Living people
Light-middleweight boxers
Boxers at the 1996 Summer Olympics
Olympic boxers of Ukraine
Ukrainian male boxers